ParentMap is a free monthly news magazine for parents in the Puget Sound area of the Pacific Northwest of the United States, published since April 2003. The magazine is available at various locations throughout the Puget Sound and also offers mail delivery via subscription.

ParentMap publishes daily website articles related to various parenting topics, including Out & About, Baby, Health, Education, and Food & Home. The website also offers a searchable online events calendar for family-related activities, as well as a family directory, where parents can search for local businesses and classes that cater to families. Readers can subscribe to the ParentMap eNews weekly email newsletters to learn about the latest articles and events.

ParentMap sponsors a yearly lecture series for parents (called ParentEd Talks), and publishes several special periodicals, including Seattle Baby Guide and Eastside Baby Guide, designed for expectant and new parents, plus supplements that focus on education and winter & summer activities. ParentMap also publishes parenting books.

References

External links
 

Monthly magazines published in the United States
Women's magazines published in the United States
Free magazines
Local interest magazines published in the United States
Magazines established in 2003
Magazines published in Washington (state)
Parenting magazines